Gustavo Menezes (born 19 September 1994) is an American racing driver, currently racing for Peugeot Sport in the FIA World Endurance Championship.

Career

Karting
Menezes began karting in 2002, but took his first championship in 2005 in the IKF Region 7 Sprint - HPV 1 Cadet. In 2008 he began karting outside the United States. In Asia he competed in the CIK-FIA Asia-Pacific Championship becoming 5th in the championship in 2008. That same year Carlos Sainz, Jr. won the championship. In Europe he competed in championship in among others Monaco, Sweden and Belgium. He competes in karting championship from time to time, but he started his single-seater career in 2010.

German Formula Three
In 2013 Menezes competed in the German Formula Three. He drove the full season with Van Amersfoort Racing and won two races. He became 4th in the championship with 241 points.

American Le Mans Series/United SportsCar Championship

Menezes began his endurance racing career in 2013, driving for RSR Racing in the American Le Mans Series in the Prototype Challenge class. He only entered the Petit Le Mans with co-drivers Bruno Junqueira and Duncan Ende and finished 29th overall and 6th in class.

Both in 2014 and 2015 he competed again with RSR Racing and again in the Prototype Challenge class. In those two seasons he entered three races. In 2014 he only entered the 24 Hours of Daytona, but he and his co-drivers were unable to finish and were classified in a disappointing 63rd position. In 2015 he entered the first two races of the season: the 24 Hours of Daytona, where he finished 34th overall and 4th in class, and the 12 Hours of Sebring, where he finished 31st overall and 6th in class.

FIA European Formula 3 Championship
After he had finished 4th in the championship in the German Formula Three, Menezes graduated to the FIA European Formula 3 Championship in 2014 and drove again with Van Amersfoort Racing. He finished 11th in the championship and managed to take two third-place finishes at Spa-Francorchamps. In 2015 he joined Jagonya Ayam with Carlin.

Racing record

Career summary

† As Menezes was a guest driver, he was ineligible for points.
* Season still in progress.

Complete German Formula Three Championship results
(key) (Races in bold indicate pole position) (Races in italics indicate fastest lap)

Complete FIA Formula 3 European Championship results
(key) (Races in bold indicate pole position) (Races in italics indicate fastest lap)

Complete IMSA SportsCar Championship results
(key)(Races in bold indicate pole position, Results are overall/class)

Complete Global RallyCross Championship results

GRC Lites

Complete FIA World Endurance Championship results

* Season still in progress.

Complete 24 Hours of Le Mans results

Complete European Le Mans Series results

‡ Half points awarded as less than 75% of race distance was completed.

References

External links

1994 births
Living people
People from Los Angeles
24 Hours of Le Mans drivers
Formula Renault 2.0 Alps drivers
Formula Renault Eurocup drivers
FIA Formula 3 European Championship drivers
WeatherTech SportsCar Championship drivers
Indy Pro 2000 Championship drivers
International Kart Federation drivers
24 Hours of Daytona drivers
FIA World Endurance Championship drivers
Carlin racing drivers
German Formula Three Championship drivers
American Le Mans Series drivers
Global RallyCross Championship drivers
Asian Le Mans Series drivers
European Le Mans Series drivers
Juncos Hollinger Racing drivers
Team Pelfrey drivers
Van Amersfoort Racing drivers
Signature Team drivers
Rebellion Racing drivers
JDC Motorsports drivers
DragonSpeed drivers
G-Drive Racing drivers
Peugeot Sport drivers
Fortec Motorsport drivers